Westville is a hamlet in the East Lindsey district of Lincolnshire, England. Westville lies in the fen country close to the village of Frithville, with which it shares the civil parish of Frithville and Westville.

Westville consists of Westville Farm and a couple of houses including the original Farmhouse, (Home Farm). Home Farm's barn was sold off and has now been converted into a barn conversion.

Westville was created a township after the draining of the West Fen in 1812, and was created a civil parish in 1866.

John Rennie directed the building of an early-19th-century bridge over the Twenty Foot Drain at Westville; it is Grade II listed.

References

External links

Hamlets in Lincolnshire
East Lindsey District